Huayruruni (possibly from Aymara wayruru red and black seeds of a plant (Abrus precatorius, Ormosia coccinea and Ormosia minor); also meaning something very beautiful, -ni a suffix to indicate ownership) is a mountain in the Vilcanota mountain range in the Andes of Peru, about  high. It is located in the Cusco Region, Quispicanchi Province, Marcapata District. It lies northwest of the peaks of Quinsachata and Quehuesiri.

References

Mountains of Cusco Region
Mountains of Peru